The Campeonato Amapaense Segunda Divisão (English: Campeonato Amapaense Second Division) was the second tier of the football league of the state of Amapá, Brazil.

History
Having their first tournament played in 1955, the division was often not disputed, and became a qualifying stage to the Campeonato Amapaense in 2005 and 2007. After that year, the second division was abandoned.

List of champions

Above is the list with all champions of Amapá second division:

Amateur era

Professional era

Titles by team

References

External links
  
 Campeonato Amapaense Second Division at RSSSF

 
State football leagues in Brazil